The 2020 season was Hammarby Fotboll's 105th in existence, their 51st season in Allsvenskan and their 6th consecutive season in the league. They competed in Allsvenskan, Svenska Cupen and Europa League during the year. League play was planned to start in early April, but was postponed until June due to concerns over the coronavirus pandemic. Stefan Billborn made his third season as manager.

Summary
In a season postponed due to the COVID-19 pandemic, the side disappointedly finished 8th in the Allsvenskan table. The club won 3–0 against Puskás Akadémia in the first round of the 2020–21 UEFA Europa League, but was eliminated from the tournament in the second round against Lech Poznań through a 0–3 loss.

Players

Squad information

Transfers

In

Out

Player statistics

Appearances and goals

|-
! colspan=12 style=background:#DCDCDC; text-align:center| Goalkeepers

|-
! colspan=12 style=background:#DCDCDC; text-align:center| Defenders

|-
! colspan=12 style=background:#DCDCDC; text-align:center| Midfielders

|-
! colspan=12 style=background:#DCDCDC; text-align:center| Forwards

|-
! colspan="18" style="background:#dcdcdc; text-align:center"| Players transferred/loaned out during the season

Club

Coaching staff
{|
|valign="top"|

Other information

Pre-season and friendlies

Friendlies

Competitions

Allsvenskan

League table

Results summary

Results by round

Matches
Kickoff times are in (UTC+01) unless stated otherwise.

June

July

August

September

October

November

December

Svenska Cupen

2019–20
The tournament continued from the 2019 season.

Kickoff times are in UTC+1.

Group 3

Knockout stage

2020–21
The tournament continues into the 2021 season.

Qualification stage

UEFA Europa League
Kickoff times are in UTC+1 unless stated otherwise.

2020–21

Qualifying phase and play-off round

First qualifying round

Second qualifying round

Footnotes

References

Hammarby Fotboll seasons
Hammarby Fotboll